Ireland competed at the 2000 Summer Olympics in Sydney, Australia.

Medalists

Silver
 Sonia O'Sullivan – Athletics, Women's 5000m

Results by event

Athletics

Men's Competition
Men's 100m
 Paul Brizzell
 Round 1 – 10.62 (→ did not advance)

Men's 200m
 Paul Brizzell
 Round 1 – 20.98 (→ did not advance)

Men's 400m
 Tomas Coman
 Round 1 – 46.17 (→ did not advance)

Men's 800m
 David Matthews
 Round 1 – 01:48.77 (→ did not advance)

Men's 1,500m
 James Nolan
 Round 1 – 03:40.50 (→ did not advance)

Men's 5,000m
 Mark Carroll
 Round 1 – 13:30.60 (→ did not advance)

Men's 110m Hurdles
 Peter Coghlan
 Round 1 – 14.03
 Round 2 – 13.86 (→ did not advance)

Men's 400m Hurdles
 Tom McGuirk
 Round 1 – 51.73 (→ did not advance)

Men's 4 × 100 m
 Paul Brizzell, Tom Comyns, John McAdorey, Gary Ryan
 Round 1 – 39.26 (→ did not advance)

Men's 4 × 400 m
 Tomas Coman, Robert Daly, Paul "Junior" McKee, Paul Oppermann
 Round 1 – 03:07.42 (→ did not advance)

Men's High Jump
 Brendan Reilly
 Qualifying – 2.20 (→ did not advance)

Men's Discus
 Nick Sweeney
 Qualifying – 57.37 (→ did not advance)

 John Menton
 Qualifying – 54.21 (→ did not advance)

Men's Javelin Throw
 Terry McHugh
 Qualifying – 79.90 (→ did not advance)

Men's Hammer Throw
 Paddy McGrath
 Qualifying – 67.00 (→ did not advance)

Men's 20 km Walk
 Robert Heffernan
 Final – 1:26:04 (→ 28th place)

Men's 50 km Walk
 Jamie Costin
 Final – 4:24:22 (→ 38th place)

Women's Competition
Women's 100m
 Sarah Reilly
 Round 1 – 11.56
 Round 2 – 11.53 (→ did not advance)

Women's 200m
 Sarah Reilly
 Round 1 – 23.43 (→ did not advance)

Women's 400m
 Karen Shinkins
 Round 1 – 53.27 (→ did not advance)

Women's 1,500m
 Sinead Delahunty
 Round 1 – 04:11.75 (→ did not advance)

Women's 5,000m
 Sonia O'Sullivan
 Round 1 – 15:07.91
 Final – 14:41.02 (→  Silver Medal)

 Rosemary Ryan
 Round 1 – 15:33.05 (→ did not advance)

 Breda Dennehy-Willis
 Round 1 – 15:49.58 (→ did not advance)

Women's 10,000m
 Sonia O'Sullivan
 Round 1 – 32:29.93
 Final – 30:53.37 (→ 6th place)

 Breda Dennehy-Willis
 Round 1 – 33:17.45 (→ did not advance)

Women's 400m Hurdles
 Susan Smith-Walsh
 Round 1 – 57.08 (→ did not advance)

Women's 4 × 400 m
 Emily Maher, Martina McCarthy, Ciara Sheehy, Karen Shinkins
 Round 1 – 03:32.24 (→ did not advance)

Women's 20 km Walk
 Gillian O'Sullivan
 Final – 1:33:10 (→ 10th place)

 Olive Loughnane
 Final – 1:38:23 (→ 35th place)

Badminton
Women's Singles
Sonya McGinn
 Round of 64: Bye
 Round of 32: Lost to Mia Audina Tjiptawan of Netherlands (→ did not advance)

Boxing
Men's 71 kg
Michael Roche
Round 1 – Lost to Firat Karagollu of Turkey (→ did not advance)

Canoe / Kayak

Flatwater

Men's Competition
Men's Kayak Singles 500m
 Gary Mawer
 Qualifying Heat – 01:49.705 (→ did not advance)

Men's Kayak Singles 1000m
 Gary Mawer
 Qualifying Heat – 03:45.787
 Semifinal – 03:50.363 (→ did not advance)

Slalom

Men's Competition
Men's Kayak Singles
 Ian Wiley
 Qualifying – 266.42 (→ did not advance)

Women's Competition
Women's Kayak Singles
 Eadaoin Ní Challarain
 Qualifying – 331.49 (→ did not advance)

Cycling

Cross Country Mountain Bike
Men's Cross Country Mountain Bike
 Robin Seymour
 Final – 2:20:40.19 (→ 28th place)

Women's Cross Country Mountain Bike
 Tarja Owens
 Final – Lapped (→ 29th place)

Road Cycling

Men's Competition
Men's Road Race
 David McCann
 Final – 5:30:46 (→ 43rd place)

 Ciarán Power
 Final – 5:34:58 (→ 74th place)

Women's Competition
Women's Road Race
 Deirdre Murphy
 Final – DNF (→ no ranking)

Rowing
Men's Lightweight Fours
Neville Maxwell 5th in the B final (→ 11th)
Neal Byrne 5th in the B final (→ 11th)
Gearoid Towey 5th in the B final (→ 11th)
Tony O'Connor 5th in the B final (→ 11th)

Sailing
Men's Single Handed Dinghy (Finn)
 David Burrows
 Race 1 – 9
 Race 2 – (16)
 Race 3 – 7
 Race 4 – 15
 Race 5 – (19)
 Race 6 – 1
 Race 7 – 10
 Race 8 – 1
 Race 9 – 6
 Race 10 – 12
 Race 11 – 8
 Final – 69 (→ 9th place)

Men's Two Handed Keelboat (Star)
 Mark Mansfield and David O'Brien
 Race 1 – (15)
 Race 2 – 12
 Race 3 – 12
 Race 4 – 10
 Race 5 – 7
 Race 6 – 9
 Race 7 – 13
 Race 8 – 3
 Race 9 – 11
 Race 10 – 13
 Race 11 – (17) OCS
 Final – 90 (→ 14th place)

Women's Single Handed Dinghy (Europe)
 Maria Coleman
 Race 1 – 11
 Race 2 – 5
 Race 3 – 3
 Race 4 – 15
 Race 5 – (17)
 Race 6 – 7
 Race 7 – 11
 Race 8 – (17)
 Race 9 – 9
 Race 10 – 14
 Race 11 – 11
 Final – 86 (→ 12th place)

Swimming
Men's 200m Butterfly
 Colin Lowth
 Preliminary Heat – 02:03.91 (→ did not advance)

Men's 100m Breaststroke
 Andrew Bree
 Preliminary Heat – 01:04.58 (→ did not advance)

Men's 200m Breaststroke
 Andrew Bree
 Preliminary Heat – 02:18.14 (→ did not advance)

Women's 50m Freestyle
 Chantal Gibney
 Preliminary Heat – 27.46 (→ did not advance)

Women's 100m Freestyle
 Chantal Gibney
 Preliminary Heat – 58.79 (→ did not advance)

Women's 200m Freestyle
 Chantal Gibney
 Preliminary Heat – 02:05.24 (→ did not advance)

Women's 400m Freestyle
 Chantal Gibney
 Preliminary Heat – 04:23.73 (→ did not advance)

Women's 100m Breaststroke
 Emma Robinson
 Preliminary Heat – 01:13.41 (→ did not advance)

References

Wallechinsky, David (2004). The Complete Book of the Summer Olympics (Athens 2004 Edition). Toronto, Canada. .
International Olympic Committee (2001). The Results. Retrieved 12 November 2005.
Sydney Organising Committee for the Olympic Games (2001). Official Report of the XXVII Olympiad Volume 1: Preparing for the Games. Retrieved 20 November 2005.
Sydney Organising Committee for the Olympic Games (2001). Official Report of the XXVII Olympiad Volume 2: Celebrating the Games. Retrieved 20 November 2005.
Sydney Organising Committee for the Olympic Games (2001). The Results. Retrieved 20 November 2005.
International Olympic Committee Web Site
sports-reference

Nations at the 2000 Summer Olympics
2000 Summer Olympics
2000 in Irish sport